Jessie Weston may refer to:
Jessie Weston (scholar) (1850–1928), English independent scholar, medievalist and folklorist
Jessie Weston (writer) (1865–1939), New Zealand novelist and journalist